The Green Ray is a 1986 French film by Éric Rohmer. It was released as The Green Ray in the UK and as  Summer in North America but is not part of Rohmer's Four Seasons series. The film is the fifth of his Comedies and Proverbs. The film was inspired by the eponymous novel by Jules Verne. It was shot in France on 16 mm film and much of the dialogue is improvised. The film won the Golden Lion and the FIPRESCI Prize at the 1986 Venice Film Festival.

Plot
At the start of summer vacation, Delphine has just suffered the breakup of a relationship and her traveling companion has ditched her so that her new boyfriend can accompany her to Greece instead. She is left without plans at a time when Paris is emptying for the summer. Another friend invites Delphine to join a beach party for the weekend, but she finds that she's the only one amongst the group who is single so she quickly returns to Paris. Her family pressures her to spend the holidays with them in Ireland, but she resists. She travels alone to the Alps, but is put off by hordes of vacationers and turns around. Traveling restlessly, the theme of the movie (characterized by Roger Ebert) becomes clear: Delphine "is incapable of playing the dumb singles games that lead to one-night stands".

She meets a new girlfriend, who flirts with two young men and she flees in anger. She recoils from the chat-up lines of the guys she meets in bars and on trains. She simply cannot engage in that kind of mindless double-talk any longer. Beneath her boredom is genuine anger at the roles that single women are sometimes expected to play. While in Biarritz she eavesdrops on a conversation about Jules Verne's novel  (The Green Ray). According to Verne, when one sees a rare green flash at sunset, one's own thoughts and those of others are revealed as if by magic. At the Biarritz railway station she meets a young man who is travelling to Saint-Jean-de-Luz. She goes with him and together they observe  (the green flash).

Cast
 Marie Rivière as Delphine
 Béatrice Romand as Béatrice
 Carita as Léna
 Rosette as Françoise in Paris
 Vincent Gauthier as Jacques in Biarritz
 Amira Chemakhi as a woman in Paris
 Maria Luisa Garcia as Manuella in Paris

Production

In 1980 Rohmer began a series of films each based on a proverb, the "Comedies and Proverbs". The fifth of the series was The Green Ray in 1986. The theme was a phrase from Rimbaud, ("Oh! May the time come when hearts fall in love"). Rohmer said that "I was struck by the naturalness of television interviews. You can say that here, nature is perfect. If you look for it, you find it because people forget the cameras". As was becoming his custom in pre-production, Rohmer gathered his cast together to discuss the project and their characters and allowed each actor to invent their dialogue. Rohmer stated that lead actress Marie Rivière "is the one who called the shots, not only by what she said, but by the way she'd speak, the way she'd question people, and also by the questions her character evoked from the others".

The film was shot chronologically and in 16 mm so as to be "as inconspicuous as possible, to have Delphine blend into the crowd as a way, ultimately, of accentuating her isolation". Rohmer also instructed his cinematographer, Sophie Maintigneux, to keep technical aspects of the shoot to a minimum so as to not interrupt or distract the actors. The film's only major expense was a trip to the Canary Islands to film the green rays there. Rohmer chose to premiere the film on Canal Plus TV, a pay-TV station that paid $130,000 for the film, which was only one fifth of its budget. Rohmer stated that "Cinema here will survive only because of television. Without such an alliance we won't be able to afford French films". The experiment paid off when the film was a theatrical hit after being released three days after its initial broadcast.

Reception
The Green Ray won the Golden Lion and the FIPRESCI Prize at the 1986 Venice Film Festival. It was mostly praised by film critics, although Alain Robbe-Grillet wrote an unfavorable review and stated "I didn't like it very much". In the 2012 Sight & Sound polls of the greatest films ever made, The Green Ray made the top-10 lists of six critics and three directors. Roger Ebert of the Chicago Sun-Times gave the film 3 out of 4 and wrote Rohmer "is interested in the times between the big moments, the times when boredom and disenchantment set in" and "Perhaps he believes that you can best judge a person's character by observing how they behave when they feel they are not being judged".

References

External links
 
 
 
 

1986 films
1986 romantic drama films
Films directed by Éric Rohmer
1980s French-language films
Golden Lion winners
Films produced by Margaret Ménégoz
Films about vacationing
French romantic drama films
1980s French films